Biplab Dasgupta (2 January 1938 – 17 July 2005) was a Marxian economist, former member of Rajya Sabha , Lok Sabha and the Bengal state committee of the CPI(M). He was the author of several books on the agrarian economy of India.

Biography

Dr. Biplab Dasgupta received his MA in economics from the University of Calcutta.  In 1967 he received the PhD of London University as a member of SOAS for the thesis "Oil prices and the Indian market, 1886-1964" where his supervisor was Edith Penrose. He also received an MSc degree in computer science from the University of London.

Dasgupta was a popular student leader of 1950s and became a member of CPI in 1955. He joined CPI(M) in 1964.

He was elected a member of the state committee in 1980. He became a central committee member of the CPI(M) in 1985. A teacher at London and Sussex universities, Dasgupta acted as adviser to UN bodies including FAO, ILO, UNESCO, UNRISD and UNEP between 1972 and 1978. He was also the editor of Nandan Patrika, the cultural monthly of CPI(M) . He was elected to Lok Sabha in 1989.

Death 
Biplab Dasgupta died from Parkinson's disease at age 66.

Notable Works

Books 
The Oil Industry in India : some economic aspects (1971)
The Naxalite Movement (1975)
Patterns and Trends in Indian Politics (1976)
Migration from Rural Areas (1977)
Village Society and Labour Use (1977)
Agrarian Change and the New Technology in India (1977)
Village Studies in the Third World (1977)
The New Agrarian Technology and India (1980)
Naxalbadi Andolon (In hindi) (1980) 
 Urbanisation Migration and Rural Change (1984)
Calcutta's Urban Future: Agonies from the Past and Prospects for the Future (1992)
Urbanisation in India : Basic Services and People's participation (1993)
Structural Adjustment, Global Trade and the New Political Economy of Development (1998)
European Trade and Colonial Conquest (Anthem South Asian Studies)  (2005)
Globalization: India's Adjustment Experience (2005)
He also wrote a number of books in Bengali on a variety of topics like his experiences as an administrator in CADC. His last book was a treatise the development of the Bengalis, their history, society, economics, culture and language. 

He was also widely travelled and he regularly contributed about his experiences in forty countries and inside India in various Bengali periodicals like Pratikshan and Nandan . His experience in various part of Africa is compelled in 'Africa Omnibus' (in Bengali).

References
Obituary at India Times
Obituary at Express India

1938 births
2005 deaths
Academics of the University of Sussex
Alumni of the London School of Economics
Alumni of the University of London
Communist Party of India (Marxist) politicians from West Bengal
Neurological disease deaths in India
Deaths from Parkinson's disease
20th-century Indian economists
India MPs 1989–1991
Marxian economists
Rajya Sabha members from West Bengal
University of Calcutta alumni
Lok Sabha members from West Bengal
Indian agricultural economists
Indian political writers
Indian male writers
20th-century Indian non-fiction writers
Scientists from West Bengal
Writers from West Bengal
People from Kolkata district